Entre Tus Brazos (English: In Your Arms) is the eighth studio album recorded by Mexican performer Alejandro Fernández, It was released by Sony Music Mexico on April 25, 2000 (see 2000 in music) again in collaboration with the famous producer Emilio Estefan, Jr. and Kike Santander, co-produced by Jorge Calandrelli, Randall M. Barlow and George Noriega. This album marks the debut of Alejandro Fernández as a composer with the song "Entre Tus Brazos". He shoot videos for the songs "Quiéreme", "Háblame" and "Quisiera".

The singer received a nomination Latin Grammy Award for Best Male Pop Vocal Performance in the 1st Annual Latin Grammy Awards, on Wednesday, September 13, 2000, losing to Luis Miguel's "Tú Mirada".

Track listing
 Háblame (Shakira Mebarak) - 4:28
 Quisiera (Kike Santader) - 4:04
 Estás Aquí (Kike Santander) - 4:52
 Quiéreme (Randall Barlow, Angie Chirino, George Noriega) - 4:52
 Si Te Vas (Kike Santander) - 4:01
 Nunca Me Arrepiento (Emilio Estefan, Jr.) - 3:28
 Agua De Mar (Kike Santander) - 4:52
 Siento (Roberto Blades, Jorge Casas, Angie Chirino, Emilio Estefan, Jr.) - 3:54
 Entre Tus Brazos (Ximena Díaz, Jorge Estrada, Alejandro Fernández) - 4:28
 No Será Igual (Kike Santander) - 4:32
 Cada Mañana (Francisco Céspedes) - 3:21
 Te Llevo Guardada (Kike Santander) - 4:12
 Enséñame (Kike Santander) - 3:58

Chart performance

Album

Singles

Sales and certifications

References

2000 albums
Alejandro Fernández albums
Spanish-language albums
Epic Records albums
Sony Discos albums
Sony Music Mexico albums
Albums produced by Emilio Estefan
Albums produced by Kike Santander